Grand Masti, also referred to as Masti 2, is a 2013 Indian Hindi-language adult comedy film directed by Indra Kumar and produced by Ashok Thakeria. The film is a sequel to the 2004 film Masti, and the second installment of Masti (film series). It features Riteish Deshmukh, Vivek Oberoi and Aftab Shivdasani reprising their roles from the original, yet the film does not continue and is a new installment. The film also stars Bruna Abdullah, Karishma Tanna, Sonalee Kulkarni, Kainaat Arora, Maryam Zakaria and Manjari Fadnis.

Grand Masti was released on 13 September 2013, and was one of the highest-grossing Bollywood films of 2013. The film received largely negative responses from critics because of its extreme sexual nature, but it was a box office success. Grand Masti was the highest grossing A-rated Bollywood film in India, until it was overtaken by Kabir Singh in 2019.
The film entered Bollywood's 100 crore club. The film was declared a Super Hit in India by Box Office India. Its sequel and third installment of Masti (film series), Great Grand Masti was released on 15 July 2016.

Plot
Three friends – Meet (Vivek Oberoi), Prem (Aftab Shivdasani) and Amar (Ritesh Deshmukh) – are all unhappily married and have unsatisfactory sex lives. Meet thinks that his wife Unatti (Karishma Tanna) is having an affair with her boss; Prem thinks that his wife Tulsi (Manjari Fadnis) doesn't spend quality time with him and Amar feels that his wife Mamta (Sonalee Kulkarni) is more concerned about their son, Pappu.

One day, the men receive an invite from their college, SLUTS (Sri Lalchand University of Technology and Science), to attend their college reunion. Their wives don't come with them, so the three decide to use the trip to get up to mischief in order to escape their unhappy marriages.

When they arrive, they find that everyone else is behaving in an overly conservative manner. This is due to the fear of Principal Robert Pereira (Pradeep Rawat), who hangs people naked on a tree if they disagree with his rules. They find out that a former student, Hardik (Suresh Menon), is in a mental asylum because of the principal's deeds. Meanwhile, Prem meets one of his former teachers, Rose (Maryam Zakaria), who is seen washing her cleavage with water when ice-cream falls on her and is attracted to her. Meet meets Marlo(Kainaat Arora) who causes the car horn to blare because of her big breasts and is attracted to her. Amar meets Mary (Bruna Abdullah) who seductively opens a bottle by an opener around her neck hidden in her inner garments  and is attracted to her. The men begin to initiate affairs with the women, but soon find out that Rose, Mary and Marlo are relatives to Robert. The men's wives later arrive at the college, intending on joining them at the reunion.

The trio receive an MMS message containing footage of each of them getting intimate, and succeed in hiding the video from their wives. They find out that it was Hardik who sent the video, and he blackmails them. Their task is to kill Robert in order to fulfill Hardik's revenge, or else he will show the footage to their wives. They fail in killing him, so they decide to try to delete the videos off Hardik's phone. They succeed and continue to spend time at the reunion.

On the last day, Robert mixes a love potion into the soup, which causes people to deal out those they are attracted too. The trio end up being with Rose, Mary and Marlo, and Robert catches them red handed. While being chased by Robert, the girls reveal to the men that he is impotent. When the trio end up on the roof of a building, Hardik pushes Robert, who slides down the roof and hangs on to a bar. The men try to save him but Hardik pushes them, too, and they hang onto Robert. The girls come and push Hardik off the roof and he hangs on to Meet. The three tell Robert the truth about not making love with Marlo, Mary and Rose. The girls strip to their underwear to make a rope out of their clothes but fail. They decide to strip naked to extend the rope with their bras and panties, but the boys fall and end up in the hospital.

Their wives angrily ask them what exactly happened that night. Robert calmly replies that due to a misunderstood affair, their husbands suffered this consequence. Shortly later, a doctor comes and informs Robert that he is no more impotent since the blood now properly flows all over his body due to the pressure generated while hanging on the bar. Hardik marries Marlo. The film ends with Amar, Meet and Prem having sex with their respective wives. Robert and Hardik too have sex with Rose and Marlo. Mary is the one left alone who while bathing naked in a bathtub asks the audience to meet her.

Cast
 Riteish Deshmukh as Amar Saxena
 Vivek Oberoi as Meet Mehta
 Aftab Shivdasani as Prem Chawla
 Sonalee Kulkarni as Mamta Saxena (Amar's wife)
 Manjari Fadnis as Tulsi Chawla (Prem's wife)
 Karishma Tanna  as Unatti Mehta (Meet's wife)
 Maryam Zakaria as Rose (Prem's interest, Robert's wife)
 Bruna Abdullah As Mary (Amar's interest, Robert's daughter)
 Kainaat Arora as Marlow (Meet's interest, Robert's sister and later Hardik's wife)
 Suresh Menon as Hardik 
 Pradeep Rawat as Robert Pereira

Production
The production of the film was to begin in the first week of August 2012, but due to actor Riteish Deshmukh's father Vilasrao Deshmukh's critical health condition, the film's commencement was put off by a few days. Says a source close to the project, "Grand Masti, the sequel to Masti has been in the writing process for the last one and a half years. Finally, writers Milap Zaveri and Tushar Hiranandani cracked an idea and scripted the sequel. The film brings back the Riteish Deshmukh-Aftab Shivdasani-Vivek Oberoi trio, along with four new girls. Grand Masti was supposed to kick start this week. Then, Ritesh's father fell ill. He can't be expected to act funny at a time like this."

A suggestion that the film take off without Riteish was also put forward. However, producer Ashok Thakeria and director Indra Kumar refused, arguing that a comedy is a happy occasion and therefore all the actors needed to be comfortable. Reportedly, the film then started filming on 9 September 2012. The film's original release date was put between 31 July-late August 2013.

According to the print version of Hindustan Times (dated 18 July 2013), Grand Masti (Masti 2) was set to release on 13 September 2013. The first official theatrical trailer was uploaded on the official YouTube channel on 18 July 2013. The stadium scene was shot in DY Patil Stadium apparently.

Parts of Grand Masti was shot at the Laxmi Vilas Palace, Vadodara, in Gujarat.

Soundtrack

The film's music was composed by Anand Raj Anand and Sanjeev Darshan, and the lyricists are Kumaar and Manoj Darpan. It contains 3 songs, one remix song of the title track and one mash up.

Release
Grand Masti was made at a budget of 310 million, including the production cost of 190 million and the remaining 120 million for Print & marketing. Grand Masti was submitted to the censor board three months ahead of its release date in June 2013. The film was not released in the UAE. Grand Masti was released huge on 13 September 2013 across approximately 2100 screens in India.

Controversies
The Punjab and Haryana High Court had stayed the release of Grand Masti in Punjab, Haryana and Chandigarh on 10 September 2013, but later lifted the stay order on the film and the film was released on 13 September 2013. A division bench of the HC has vacated the stay after hearing an appeal filed by the movie's producer Ashok Thakeria against the orders of the single bench. After a complaint about vulgar and obscene dialogue in the film, the Central Board of Film Certification on 16 September 2013 said it had constituted an inquiry against the movie. A 22-year-old Vasai, Maharashtra resident, Mangesh Bhogal died due to a heart attack caused by excessive laughing.

Marketing
The film was promoted on TV shows like Comedy Nights with Kapil. The star cast also visited theatres upon the release of the film. A book on the film written by Neha Puntambekar, basically chronicling the various escapades of Amar, Meet and Prem, the three principal characters of Masti franchise was also released. Mumbai Indians cricketers Sachin Tendulkar, Harbhajan Singh and Pragyan Ojha attended a screening of the film in Ahmedabad during preparation for 2013 Champions League Twenty20.

Critical response
The film received mostly negative responses from critics due to its adult content but a polarised welcome from the general public, while youngsters constituted most of the film's viewership, it was criticised from the family audience's point of view.

Taran Adarsh of Bollywood Hungama gave the film 3.5/5 and stated that Grand Masti "crosses all limits and boundaries vis-a-vis adult humor. This one's strictly for those who relish naughty jokes, outrageous lines and scandalous visuals." Anupama Chopra of the Hindustan Times gave the film a 0.5/5 stars. Mohar Basu of Koimoi gave it 0.5/5 and called it a "grand tapestry of trash". Rajeev Masand of CNN-IBN gave 1.5 stars out of 5, commenting The sad truth is that 'Grand Masti' revels in making you cringe, not laugh. Adult humor tends to work best when some things are left to your imagination. But the makers of this film force-feed the audience images and dialogues and references so discomfiting, the only laughs you'll hear are nervous chuckles."

Rohit Khilnani of India Today awarded the film with 1.5/5 stars. Abhishek Mande of Rediff introduced 0/5 and remarked, "there is no way you can enjoy this movie and still claim you respect women".

Box office

India
Grand Masti earned the biggest opening at morning shows in 2013 on its first day. Grand Masti had a very good first day, grossing around  net. It was the highest opening day of 2013 after Chennai Express, Yeh Jawaani Hai Deewani and Race 2. Grand Masti remained steady on weekdays. Its five-day total amounted to 545.0 million nett. Grand Masti had a first-week gross of around 636.6 million nett. The film earned around 32.5–35.0 million nett on its 8th day. It had a decent second weekend of around 122.5–125.0 million nett. The film collected 52.5 million in its third weekend and subsequently 77.5 million in its third week to have a total of  nett. According to Box Office India, the film's final domestic nett was 920 million.

Overseas
The film collected $1,259,000 internationally over its first weekend. The film had collections of around $3 million in ten days.

Sequel
The sequel to the film titled Great Grand Masti was released on 15 July 2016.

Notes

References

External links

 
 

2013 films
2010s buddy comedy films
2010s sex comedy films
Films scored by Anand Raj Anand
Indian sequel films
Indian sex comedy films
Indian buddy comedy films
Films directed by Indra Kumar
Films scored by Sanjeev Darshan
2013 comedy films